Celestus macrolepis is a species of lizard of the Diploglossidae family. It is found in possibly in Jamaica.

References

Celestus
Reptiles described in 1845
Reptiles of Jamaica
Endemic fauna of Jamaica
Taxa named by John Edward Gray